Prince Nikolai Nikolayevich Obolensky (November 10, 1833 – August 25, 1898) was an Imperial Russian division commander. He was born in what is now Ulyanovsk, Ulyanovsk Oblast. He fought in wars in the Crimea, Poland and against the Ottoman Empire. He had two sons, Vladimir and Alexander.

Awards 
 Order of Saint Stanislaus (House of Romanov), 3rd class, 1863
 Order of Saint Anna, 3rd class, 1865
 Order of Saint Stanislaus (House of Romanov), 2nd class, 1869
 Order of Saint Vladimir, 4th class, 1872
 Order of Saint Anna, 2nd class, 1875
 Gold Sword for Bravery, 1878
 Order of Saint Vladimir, 3rd class, 1878
 Order of Saint George, 4th degree, 1879
 Order of Saint Stanislaus (House of Romanov), 1st class, 1880
 Order of Saint Anna, 1st class, 1883
 Order of Saint Vladimir, 2nd class, 1886
 Order of the White Eagle (Russian Empire), 1891

Sources 
 Волков С. В. Генералитет Российской империи. Энциклопедический словарь генералов и адмиралов от Петра I до Николая II. Том II. Л—Я. М., 2009
 Исмаилов Э. Э. Золотое оружие с надписью «За храбрость». Списки кавалеров 1788–1913. М., 2007
 Милорадович Г. А. Список лиц свиты их величеств с царствования императора Петра I по 1886 год. Чернигов, 1886
 Список генералам по старшинству. Составлен по 1 мая 1897 года. СПб., 1896. — С. 189
 Старчевский А. А. Памятник Восточной войны 1877–1878 гг. СПб., 1878

1833 births
1898 deaths
Russian military personnel of the Crimean War
People of the January Uprising
Russian military personnel of the Russo-Turkish War (1877–1878)
Recipients of the Order of Saint Stanislaus (Russian), 3rd class
Recipients of the Order of St. Anna, 3rd class
Recipients of the Order of Saint Stanislaus (Russian), 2nd class
Recipients of the Order of St. Vladimir, 4th class
Recipients of the Order of St. Anna, 2nd class
Recipients of the Gold Sword for Bravery
Recipients of the Order of St. Vladimir, 3rd class
Recipients of the Order of Saint Stanislaus (Russian), 1st class
Recipients of the Order of St. Anna, 1st class
Recipients of the Order of St. Vladimir, 2nd class
Recipients of the Order of the White Eagle (Russia)